H is a 2002 South Korean urban horror-thriller film. It was written and directed by Lee Jong-hyeok, and stars Yum Jung-ah, Ji Jin-hee, and Cho Seung-woo.

A serial killer who preyed on pregnant women has been behind bars for 10 months, when a copycat killer becomes active. Detectives meet with the imprisoned killer and search for clues in an effort to head off the copy cat killer before he kills more.

Plot 
Twenty-two-year-old serial killer Shin Hyun targeted pregnant women and turned himself in after committing several grisly murders. Ten months later a copycat killer became active, and detectives Kang and Kim are put on the case.

They track down the killer by following clues from the first two victims: A pregnant schoolgirl whose fetus the killer removed, and a single mother strangled from behind on a bus. They had tried to pump Shin for information, but without success. They stake out the killer's home, but when the killer comes home, he notices the cops and runs. Kang follows him into a nightclub, where the killer slices off a lesbian's ear and then slits her throat, just like Shin's third victim. Kang fires two rounds into his chest; this puts him in a coma. Despite this, the murders still continue. The police capture the next suspect, but the murders keep occurring.

In the end, it is revealed that Shin's mother had tried to abort him, but he survived. The psychologist Dr. Chu had used post-hypnotic suggestion on the other two killers to make them commit copycat murders. Kang then kills Chu (imitating Shin's murder of an abortion doctor), but Kang is triggered by a CD mailed to him. Kang kills his own mother, who was a prostitute.

In the course of the movie, Shin is executed and his final words are "I killed my mother." This explains the sixth and last unidentified victim, whom he brought in a bag to the police station when he confessed. Kang is about to commit suicide when Kim shows up and kills him instead.

Just before the ending credits, the letter "H" appears and expands into the word "hypnosis", and its definition.

Cast 
 Yum Jung-ah as Detective Kim Mi-yeon
 Ji Jin-hee as Detective Kang Tae-hyun
 Cho Seung-woo as Shin Hyun
 Sung Ji-ru as Detective Park
 Min Woong-ki as Choi Young-jin
 Park Yong-soo as Chief Jang
 Kwon Hyuk-poong as Captain Lee
 Lee Eol as Detective Han Jung-woo
 Kim In-kwon as Heo Young-taek
 Park Kil-soo as Bae Yong-man
 Kim Sun-kyung as Dr. Chu Kyung-sook
 Kim Bu-seon
 Kim Roi-ha
 Yeon Seon-mi

Awards 
H was nominated for the International Fantasy Film Award at the 2004 Fantasporto.

Reception
Kyu Hyun Kim of Koreanfilm.org praised the "distinctive production design and cinematography" and minimalist music score and sound design, which "contributes a great deal to the film's uniquely and unremittingly dark atmosphere." He also mentioned that the detectives' characterization was "believably professional and suitably humanized," aided by the cast's solid acting, notably by Sung Ji-roo's "excellent supporting performance." But he criticized the antagonist as  "misconceived" and that the climactic revelation was "a complete letdown."

Remake
A 2009 Telugu remake titled Amaravathi was directed by Ravi Babu and starred Taraka Ratna as the antagonist.

References

External links 
 
 

2002 films
2002 psychological thriller films
2000s Korean-language films
South Korean serial killer films
South Korean detective films
South Korean mystery thriller films
2000s mystery horror films
South Korean psychological thriller films
South Korean films remade in other languages
2000s South Korean films